The Ae 3/5 was a Swiss electric locomotive, operating out of Lausanne from 1926-1957, then out of Berne from 1957-1982. The examples were withdrawn from service starting in 1977, with one since classified as an historic vehicle.

History 
The first units were delivered without security devices; these were added later. The symmetrical drive system of the locomotives are roughly equal to that of the Be 4/7. 

At the end of the Second World War, the maximum speed was reduced to 75km/h. After repairs, they were again allowed proceed at speeds of 90 km/h. In 1957, the brake system was modified and traction brakes were installed. 

The locomotives were equipped with remote control ability (from a control car) between 1963 and 1966; it was not possible to control the locomotives from the units themselves. Up to two units of this type could be controlled from a control car. Once upgraded to remote units, the locomotives hauled automobile trains along the Gotthard railway and the Simplon Railway. 

The Ae 3/5 proved to be reliable locomotives in both freight and express passenger service. They were largely unchanged during their operating lifetime except for having welded front doors near the end of their service lives. Delivered in a brown paint scheme, they were later given a dark green paint job.

References

Electric locomotives
Electric locomotives of Switzerland
 Standard gauge locomotives of Switzerland
 SLM locomotives